State Road 338 (NM 338) is a  state highway in the US state of New Mexico. NM 338's southern terminus is in Animas where it continues south as Route C001 and the northern terminus is northeast of Road Forks at Interstate 10 (I-10). NM 338 and NM 9 are the only two remaining state highways to form a concurrency after the 1988 renumbering.

History

The portion of NM 338 from its southern terminus southward was transferred to Hidalgo County on May 9, 1989, in a road exchange agreement.

Major intersections

See also

References

External links

338
Transportation in Hidalgo County, New Mexico